The Digital Preservation Coalition (DPC) is a UK-based non-profit that works with global partners to provide the necessary resources to educate various public and private entities on the best practices for long term digital preservation.

Background 
The origins of the DPC are rooted in a 1995 workshop put on by the Joint Information Systems Committee and the British Library at the University of Warwick, focusing on how to approach the digital preservation.  Internet usage was rapidly increasing, user expectations of digital resources were greater, and more users and institutions were seeking information across international borders in the late-20th century.  The scholastic community at large was apprehensive to make a serious effort toward converting to digital systems without more permanent solutions to ensure the integrity and authenticity of electronic resources, due to the instability experienced in some U.S. government archives that was generated by physical decay of storage media and obsolete hardware and software.  The 1995 workshop at the University of Warwick led to research into the various necessary elements of digital preservation, which concluded in 1999.  Proposals for the DPC were published in D-lib magazine in February 2001, began operations in July of the same year, and officially launched at the House of Commons in February 2002.

Mission and Activities 
The DPC was formed to bring together various public sector organizations to come up with a solution to the growing digital preservation issue as it was deemed too difficult for any one entity to achieve that goal on their own.    Their goal was to create resources, tools, and standards to establish a universal approach to digital preservation.  Even though the DPC was originally concerned with digital preservation in the UK, they acknowledged the fact that their concern over digital preservation was shared on a global scale.

Instruction 
The resources, tools, and standards were not only created by the DPC to be applied at institutions with existing digital collections, but to teach anyone the fundamentals and best practices of digital preservation. Their primary resource for teaching the proper methods for digital preservation was originally called the Preservation Management of Digital Materials Handbook, compiled by Maggie Jones and Neil Beagrie in 2001, two former directors of the DPC.  Continuously updated, the handbook offers an easy to follow set of instructions for applying all aspects of the digital preservation process.  The handbook has not been available in hardcopy  since 2007, but was previously uploaded to the DPC website in 2002.  It underwent a major overhaul by the DPC in 2015 and was republished on their website as the 2nd edition of the Digital Preservation Handbook.  The DPC also created training workshops in order to help their members effectively implement the processes laid out in the handbook.  Their most recent training workshop was branded "Novice to Know-How", a program commissioned by the National Archives of the UK as a part of their "Plugged In, Powered Up" initiative.  Launched in May 2020, the two day course included lessons on file format preservation, a primer on DROID, and ingesting and preserving digital materials.

Advocacy 
The DPC was operating in a new aspect of the digital frontier, one that was otherwise unknown to the public at large.  They increased overall media coverage of digital preservation from a non-existent presence to one that was regularly being covered by various news outlets across print, television, and radio.  They released regular reports that were easy to digest, hosted frequent forums and seminars, and published a quarterly periodical on their website.

Awards 
Beginning in 2004, the DPC annually sponsors the Digital Preservation Award, originally through the Pilgrim Trust Conservation Awards.  It presents 5,000 GBP to entities that exemplify digital preservation leadership and achievement.

Membership 
The DPC began with 7 original members and quickly expanded to 26 within the first year of operations.  Membership was originally broken into three categories: Full Members, Associate Members, and Allied Organizations and Individuals (now referred to as Honorary Personal Members).

Full Members 
Full members are organizations that were able to participate on the board of the Coalition and in all projects.

Associate Members 
Associate members are organizations that were limited to interacting with the Advisory Council of the Coalition and participating in all other projects.

Allied Organizations and Individuals/Honorary Personal Members 
Allied Organizations are entities that were invited by the DPC to participate in projects because they other either specific knowledge or special access to industry leaders in digital preservation.  These partnerships can either exist for a set amount of time while completing a specific project or can be ongoing partnerships that come to a close when either the DPC or the allied organization deem necessary.  Allied Individuals, now called Honorary Personal Members, are also invited because of their expertise and their inability to qualify as a member.  Honorary Personal Members are automatically renewed unless otherwise stated.

Membership Today 
Today, there are over 120 combined Full and Associate Members, including: Bacardi-Martini Inc., the BBC, the Digital Curation Centre, the J. Paul Getty Trust, the Library of Congress, the United Nations HQ, Warner Bros., National Libraries across the globe, other international corporate entities, and many universities across the UK and North America.

See also
 Conservation-restoration of cultural heritage
 Digital curation
 Digital object identifier
 Digital preservation
 Framework Programmes for Research and Technological Development

References

Archival science
Archives in the United Kingdom
Conservation and restoration organizations
Digital library projects
Jisc
Library consortia
Organisations based in York
Organizations established in 2001
University of York
2001 establishments in the United Kingdom